Tadas Gražiūnas (born 18 April 1978) is a retired Lithuanian professional footballer. He made his professional debut in the A Lyga in 1995 for JR Alsa Vilnius. He played 2 games in the UEFA Intertoto Cup 2000 for FC Rostselmash Rostov-on-Don.

Honours
 Lithuanian A Lyga champion: 1998.
 A Lyga runner-up: 1999.
National Team
 Baltic Cup
 2005

References

External links

1978 births
Living people
Lithuanian footballers
Lithuania international footballers
Lithuanian expatriate footballers
Expatriate footballers in Russia
Expatriate footballers in Belarus
Expatriate footballers in Latvia
Expatriate footballers in Uzbekistan
Russian Premier League players
FK Panerys Vilnius players
FK Kareda Kaunas players
FC Rostov players
FC Moscow players
FK Atlantas players
FC Dinamo Minsk players
FC Volgar Astrakhan players
FK Žalgiris players
FC Vilnius players
FK Tauras Tauragė players
Buxoro FK players
FK Andijon players
Association football defenders